Coulibaly is a common Bambara language surname in West Africa, especially in Mali and Ivory Coast. It may refer to:

People
Any of the Bambara Empire's founding  Coulibaly dynasty, following Bitòn Coulibaly (1689–1755)
Adama Coulibaly (born 1980), Malian footballer
Adamo Coulibaly (born 1981), French footballer
Amadou Coulibaly (born 1984), Burkinabé footballer 
Amadou Gon Coulibaly (1959–2020), Prime Minister of the Ivory Coast
Amedy Coulibaly (1982–2015), assailant in shootings related to the Hypercacher kosher supermarket siege
Daniel Ouezzin Coulibaly (1909–1958), president of governing council of the French colony of Upper Volta 
Brahima Sangafowa Coulibaly, senior fellow Brookings Institution 
David Coulibaly (born 1978), Malian footballer
Dramane Coulibaly (born 1979), Malian footballer
Elimane Coulibaly (born 1980), Senegalese footballer
Fatoumata Coulibaly, Malian actress and women's rights activist
Fernand Coulibaly (born 1971), Malian former footballer
Fousseny Coulibaly (born 1989), Ivorian footballer
Gary Coulibaly (born 1986), French footballer
Ibrahim Coulibaly, rebel leader in Côte d'Ivoire during 1999 and 2002
Kalifa Coulibaly (born 1991), Malian footballer
Karim Coulibaly (born 1993), Senegalese-born French footballer
Koman Coulibaly, Malian football referee
Mamoutou Coulibaly (born 1984), Malian footballer
Micheline Coulibaly (1950–2003), Ivorian writer
Moussa Coulibaly (born 1981), Malian footballer 
Souleymane Coulibaly, Ivorian footballer
Soumaila Coulibaly (born 1978), Malian footballer
Tanguy Coulibaly (born 2001), French footballer of Malian descent

Other
Coulibaly, a track from the 2003 album Dimanche à Bamako, a collaboration between Malian singers Amadou & Miriam and Franco-Spanish performer Manu Chao

Bambara-language surnames